Tim Fountain (born 23 December 1967) is a British writer.

Early life
Fountain was born in Dewsbury, West Yorkshire. An only child, he was brought up in a pub in the village of West Ardsley, West Yorkshire.

He was educated at Batley Grammar School, Wheelwright sixth form college and Hull University.

Career

Theatre 
Fountain's first international success was Resident Alien in 1999. Based on the life and writings of Quentin Crisp, starring Bette Bourne and directed by Mike Bradwell, the show opened at the Bush Theatre, London, before transferring to New York Theatre Workshop where it played a sell-out season and won two OBIE Awards (performance and design). The show subsequently won a Herald Angel award for Bette Bourne at the Edinburgh Festival and toured across America, Australia and the UK. It was also broadcast on BBC Radio 3.

Fountain's one-man show, Sex Addict, opened at the Edinburgh Festival in April 2004. During the 90-minute show, Fountain would discuss various sex topics, in person and online, and tackle issues of homophobia and the perceived immorality of promiscuity. At the end, he encouraged the audience to select the next person he should have sex with on the dating website Gaydar. After Gaydar later sent him a cease and desist letter, Fountain asked the audience to choose somebody from a list of online volunteers or nominate themselves. The List praised the show for its humor and The London Evening Standard called it "artistically criminal". The show later transferred to London's Royal Court Theatre in January 2005  and the Schaubühne in Berlin.

Fountain's other plays include Tchaikovsky in the Park which played a season at the Bridewell Theatre in London. Last Bus From Bradford (winner of the Pink Paper Play Award) which was staged at the Drill Hall in London. Julie Burchill Is Away, about the controversial newspaper columnist Julie Burchill, starring Jackie Clune, Deep Rimming in Poplar starring Bette Bourne, and the stage adaptation of Toby Young's book, How To Lose Friends and Alienate People starring Jack Davenport all of which played seasons at Soho Theatre in London's West End. Fountain adapted the Oscar-winning movie Midnight Cowboy for the stage starring Con O Neil and Charles Aitken. for the Assembly Rooms in Edinburgh.

His play about Rock Hudson and his agent Henry Willson, Rock, opened in Liverpool before transferring to the Oval House Theatre in London starring Bette Bourne as Hudson's agent Henry Willson and Michael Xavier as Hudson. This play went on to win 'Best online drama' at the BBC audio Drama Awards 2012. His adaptation of "Dandy in the Underworld" by Sebastian Horsley starring Milo Twomey played a season at Soho Theatre.

Fountain's comedy about sex tourism in Egypt during Arab Spring, Queen of the Nile, opened at Hull Truck Theatre in 2013. It was directed by Mike Bradwell and starred Dudley Sutton in a supporting role. Clare Brennan of The Guardian praised the depth in the characters and dialogue but noted that there is a "lack of dramatic conflict."

His short play 'Beyond the Fringe', which satirised a left wing Mother's obsession with the Israel/Palestine conflict, was performed in a season of 6 new plays written by amongst other Caryl Churchill and Mark Ravenhill at the Edinburgh fringe in 2015. It made front-page news in the Times newspaper when fountain attacked (in print) the militant left wing protestors blocking the audience from entering a show performed by Israeli students. It transferred to John Bercow (The speaker of the House of Commons) apartment in the House of Commons where it was performed in front of Shami Chakrabati and the deputy head of The Met and featured a golliwog entering from the Speaker's bedroom.

His most recent play EastEndless, performed by James Holmes, was a sell out success at the Camden Festival in 2019 and will play Wiltons Music Hall in June 2020 before a run at the Edinburgh Fringe.

He directed the West End Production of Puppetry of the Penis. The show was originally scheduled to run for a month at the Whitehall Theatre but ran for a year before going on to play Broadway, touring the UK for six years and playing many countries around the world. During this time he began an affair with the then-lesbian comedian Jackie Clune. In the same year he was also a principal writer on the animated television sitcom version of Oscar-winning Bob and Margaret which was broadcast on Channel Four in the UK and Comedy Central in the USA.

Writing 
His books include Quentin Crisp: a biography, published by Absolute Press. So You Want to Be a Playwright?, published by Nick Hern. Rude Britannia, his book about the sex lives of the British is published by Weidenfeld & Nicolson. He has written for numerous publications including The Guardian, The Sunday Times, Daily Mail, The Scotsman, Scotland on Sunday, New Statesman and Attitude. Fountain has appeared on Newsnight, Woman's Hour, Saturday Review and Loose Ends on BBC Radio Four and Weekender on BBC Radio 2. He presented a documentary about the death of Quentin Crisp for Channel Four.

He is a playwriting teacher and has tutored for many organisations including the Central School of Speech and Drama, The Arvon Foundation MIT and Dartmouth College in the USA. He was a creative writing lecturer at Strathclyde University and Literary Manager of the Bush Theatre in London.

Bibliography

Harold's Day – 1989
Morning has Broken – 1990
Tchaikovsky in the park – 1993
Last bus from Bradford − 1995
A northern wanker in London – 1996
Resident Alien – 1999
Quentin Crisp, a biography – 2002
Julie Burchill Is Away – 2002
How To Lose Friends and Alienate People – 2003
Deep Rimmin in Poplar – 2004
Sex Addict – 2004
Cinderella − 2005
Midnight Cowboy – 2006
So You Want To Be A Playwright – 2007
Rock – 2008
Dandy in the Underworld – 2010
Rude Britannia – 2012
Queen of the Nile − 2013
Julie Burchill – Absolute Cult – 2014
Beyond the Fringe – 2015
Television Street – 2015
Supping with the Devil – 2017
EastEndless – 2019

External links
BBC Radio Front Row on Julie Burchill Is Away.
Independent Arts Diary on Isabella Blow play and Queen of the Nile
Daily Telegraph on Midnight Cowboy
Obituary of Sebastian Horsley, The Independent
Julie Burchill is Away review, London Evening Standard
Julie Burchill is Away, Telegraph
Sex at the click of a mouse, New Statesman
Bradford Telegraph and Argus, Rude Britannia
 Rock, Winner BBC audio drama award 2012
Review of Queen of the Nile, British Theatre guide
Review of Queen of the Nile, Plays to See
Review of Queen Of The Nile, Stage
Podcast with Mike Bradwell, British Theatre Guide 2013
, "The Spectator", Julie Burchill Absolute Cult 2014
, "reviews gate", Beyond the Fringe 2015.

Living people
1967 births
People from Dewsbury
British dramatists and playwrights
British male dramatists and playwrights